Elephant's Graveyard is a special collection of B-sides and rarities from singer-songwriter Ed Harcourt. The collection was made available as a digital download only in the UK, and as a hard-to-find promo only 2-CD set in the US (released by Astralwerks Records). The collection spans roughly 5 years of music, some of which had been previously unreleased.

Ed also posted a track-by-track discussion of the collection on his website.

Track listing
All songs written by Ed Harcourt, except where noted.

Part 1
 "The Unlucky One" – 4:46
 "T Bone Tombstone" – 3:14
 "Here Be Monsters" – 4:43
 "I've Become Misguided" – 5:37
 "When Americans Come to London" – 5:05
 "Alligator Boy" – 5:29
 "Weary and Bleary Eyed" – 5:27
 "Last of the Troubadors" – 4:22
 "Little Silver Bullet" – 3:06
 "Sleepyhead" – 3:55
 "Coal Black Heart" – 4:54
 "Blackwoods Back Home" – 5:12
 "Still I Dream of It" (Brian Wilson) – 5:24
 "The Ghosts Parade" – 5:36

Part 2
 "Angels on Your Body" – 4:13
 "The Hammer and the Nail" – 5:18
 "She Put a Curse on Me (Parts I & II)" – 6:07
 "The Iceman Cometh" – 4:29
 "Asleep at the Helm" – 3:50
 "Sugarbomb" – 3:12
 "Paid to Get Drunk" – 3:45
 "Atlantic City" (Bruce Springsteen) – 3:45
 "Deathsexmarch" – 1:17
 "Mysteriously" – 3:34
 "Only Happy When You're High" – 4:21
 "Breathe a Little Softer" – 4:56
 "Every Night" – 2:53
 "Epitaph" – 2:14

Credits
Part 1:
 Track 1: previously unreleased
 Tracks 2-3: from "Something in My Eye" single (11 June 2001)
 Tracks 4-5: from "She Fell Into My Arms" single (10 September 2001)
 Tracks 6-9: from "Apple of My Eye" single (21 January 2002)
 Track 10: from a magazine compilation CD
 Tracks 11-12: from "All of Your Days Will Be Blessed" (3 February 2003)
 Tracks 13-14: from "Still I Dream of It" single (28 October 2002)
 Track 13: Brian Wilson cover
Part 2:
 Track 1: bonus track from the Japanese pressing of From Every Sphere
 Track 2: bonus track from the US pressing of From Every Sphere
 Tracks 3-5: previously unreleased
 Tracks 6-7: from "Watching the Sun Come Up" single (19 May 2003)
 Track 8: Bruce Springsteen cover
 Tracks 9-10: from "This One's for You" single (30 August 2004)
 Tracks 11-12: from "Born in the '70s" single (1 November 2004)
 Tracks 13-14: from "Loneliness" single (14 February 2005)

Ed Harcourt albums
2005 compilation albums
albums produced by Tchad Blake
albums produced by Gil Norton
Heavenly Recordings compilation albums